A Frutería or Mexican juice bar (Literal translation: Fruit-shop) is a juice bar that primarily serves Mexican desserts, beverages, antojitos and other popular Mexican snack foods. Mexican juice bars are popular establishments in many parts of Mexico and more recently in Mexican American communities in South-Western United States.

Structure

Mexican juice bars serve a lot of the same foods as the popular fruit and juice stands and roadside carts in Mexico. The advantage of a juice bar is that it can provide more menu items, refrigerate its ingredients, keeping them fresh for longer periods of time, and juice bars are also generally cleaner and more comfortable as they offer guests a place to sit down and enjoy their food.

Mexican juice bars can be stand alone businesses or part of a larger establishment like a carnicería (Mexican meat market). Mexican juice bars are also sometimes combined with panaderías (Mexican bakeries) or taquerías (Mexican taco shops).

Most Mexican juice bars attempt to promote healthy eating and as such, many of the items are healthy choices that involve fruits, vegetables and grains in some way or another.

Common menu items

Mexican juice bars can offer a variety of menu items. The following is a list of common desserts and beverages found at Mexican juice bars:

Aguas frescas
Bionico
Blended coffee
Chicharrónes (fried pork rinds with lime and hot sauce)
Diablitos (mango sorbet with chamoy)
Escamocha (Mexican fruit cocktail)
Parfait
Frutas picadas (chopped assorted fruits with lime and chili powder)
Helados
Jugos naturales (fresh fruit and vegetable juices like green juice)
Licuados
Malteadas
Mangoneada (raspado with chopped mango, chamoy, chili powder, tamarind and mango syrup and a tamarind candy straw)
Paletas
Raspados
Tejuino
Tepache
Tostilocos

Gallery

References

See also
Juice bar
Mexican street food

Mexican restaurants